is a Shinto shrine in Ebetsu, Hokkaidō, Japan. It was built in honour of the Taishō Emperor in 1915 and is modelled on the shinmei-zukuri style. Within the shrine is enshrined Amaterasu.

See also
 State Shinto
 List of Shinto shrines in Hokkaidō

References

External links
 Ebetsu Jinja homepage

Shinto shrines in Hokkaido
Buildings and structures completed in 1915